The screaming hairy armadillo (Chaetophractus vellerosus) is a species of armadillo also known as the small screaming armadillo, crying armadillo or the small hairy armadillo. It is a burrowing armadillo found in the central and southern parts of South America. The adjective "screaming" derives from its habit of squealing when handled.

Taxonomy
The animal was first described by J. E. Gray in 1865 from a specimen in the British Museum collected from Santa Cruz de la Sierra in eastern Bolivia as Dasypus vellerosus. Two subspecies are currently recognized (C. v. vellerosus (Gray, 1865) and C. v. pannosus (Gardner, 2007)) although the taxonomic validity of the split has been called into question.

Description

This is one of the smallest and slenderest species of the genus Chaetophractus, but it has longer ears than others in its genus.

The animal was initially described by Gray as follows:
"The forehead convex, with many polygonal shields; the dorsal shield covered with abundant elongated bristly hairs; the underside of the body covered with close hairs. Toes 5/5, the outer and inner hinder small."

These armadillos have more hair growth than other armadillo species. The armadillo has 18 bands of which six to eight are movable bands. The hair on the dorsum is light brown in colour.

Range and habitat
The screaming hairy armadillo is a burrowing armadillo of arid areas from low to high altitudes. It is found in parts of the Gran Chaco and Pampas areas of Argentina, Bolivia, and Paraguay.  An isolated population is found in eastern Buenos Aires Province in Argentina.

Its natural habitats are subtropical or tropical dry forests, temperate shrubland, subtropical or tropical dry shrubland, temperate grassland, subtropical or tropical dry lowland grassland, hot deserts, temperate desert, arable land, pastureland, and plantations. It is absent in rocky areas where the armadillo would not be able to burrow.

Behaviour
The armadillo is nocturnal by summer and diurnal in winter. It can subsist for long periods without water. It often burrows at the base of bushes and shrubs. It has multiple burrows in its range, and each burrow may have more than one entrance. When an animal is occupying a burrow, the entrance is usually sealed. A burrow may be  in diameter and may be several metres long. 

The animal does not build a nest in its burrow.

Diet
When not in its burrow, the animal spends most of its time foraging. The armadillo is omnivorous; its diet consists of insects, vertebrates and plant material (especially pods of Prosopis), varying considerably depending upon the season. Vertebrates form a significant part of an armadillo's diet, ranging from 27.7% by volume in summer to 13.9% in winter, the most common prey species being lizards, birds, frogs, and the mice species Eligmodontia typus and Phyllotis griseofulvus. This armadillo ingests a lot of sand while feeding, and it may occupy as much as 50% of the volume of its stomach at a time.

Reproduction

The gestation period of the armadillo is 60–75 days. The armadillos become sexually mature at 9 months and produce two litters per year.

Human interaction
This armadillo is heavily hunted for its meat in parts of the Chaco region in Bolivia. It is at times considered an agricultural pest and killed by hunting dogs. The disjunct population of coastal Buenos Aires Province, Argentina, is adversely affected by mining activities. The carapace is particularly sought for making charangos, a South American musical instrument akin to a lute.

References

Armadillos
Mammals of Argentina
Mammals of Bolivia
Mammals of Paraguay
Mammals of Patagonia
Least concern biota of South America
Mammals described in 1865
Taxa named by John Edward Gray
Taxonomy articles created by Polbot